Edward Rowe is a Cornish actor, known for the lead role as a struggling fisherman in the BAFTA-winning film Bait and for the Kernow King character.

Early life
Rowe is from Roche in Cornwall where he started his standup routine and YouTube video series. He attended Poltair School from the age of 11 to 16.

Career
His Kernow King character features a strong Cornish identity and speaks in a strong Cornish accent. In mid 2010 he produced a series of short comedy videos on Cornish themes, often in the spoof documentary format. Examples include the Camborne Maid's song remake of musician Billy Joel’s "Uptown Girl". This led to 2014 a standup tour, Splann!.

In 2015, he starred in Kernow King's sex tape, an educational film produced by Cornwall Council's Health Promotion Service. This was nominated for the UK Sexual Health Awards. Rowe was made a bard of Gorsedh Kernow in 2015 "for his work as an ambassador for the Cornish identity". 

In 2017, he starred in the Hall for Cornwall's Christmas show, Sleeping Beauty.

In 2018, he wrote and starred in the play Hireth about a Cornish miner and starred in "Trevithick!" a biographical comedy about Richard Trevithick directed by Kneehigh Theatre's Simon Harvey.

He voiced the character Godfrey/Hoarah Loux in the 2022 video game Elden Ring.

References

External links
 
 

Living people
21st-century British male actors
Male actors from Cornwall
Year of birth missing (living people)